Lewis County Courthouse may refer to:

 Lewis County Courthouse (Missouri), Monticello, Missouri
 Lewis County Courthouse (Tennessee), Hohenwald, Tennessee
 Lewis County Courthouse (Washington), Chehalis, Washington, listed on the National Register of Historic Places